Gymnocypris namensis is a species of cyprinid fish endemic to China.

References 

namensis
Fish described in 1982